Bonds on Bonds is a 2006 American 10-part  reality television series starring former San Francisco Giants outfielder Barry Bonds that aired on ESPN.  The show revolved on the life of Bonds and his chase of Babe Ruth and Hank Aaron's home run records.  It was produced by Tollin/Robbins Productions.

Segment breakdown
The first segment of Bonds on Bonds, aired Tuesday, April 4 nationwide on ESPN2.  Much of the premiere episode dealt with how Bonds has coped with questions about whether steroids have fueled his athletic performance.  At one point, Bonds even started to break down in tears.  "If it makes them happy to go out of their way to try to destroy me, go right ahead.  You can't hurt me any more than you've already hurt me," he said.  He continued by saying, "You don't see me bringing anyone else into this. I'm going to take it myself."  Bonds paused as his eyes welled and he choked back tears, "And I'm going to take it because there's so many people who depend on me."

In different segments throughout the program, Bonds acknowledged his often rocky relations with the press but cast himself as a victim of critics out to tear him down.  He described himself as "mentally and emotionally drained" but insisted he was not going to let anyone "bring me down."

Criticism and cancellation
ESPN was criticized  for allowing Bonds such a one-sided public pulpit, as it was the most powerful name in American sports journalism; the show was seen by some as ESPN giving up any semblance of journalism in favor of becoming a public relations front for major sports teams and players. In June 2006, ESPN and producer Tollin/Robbins Productions officially pulled the plug on the reality series, citing "creative control" issues with star Barry Bonds and his representatives. No other details about the decision were given. Bonds on Bonds last aired May 30, 2006.

References

External links
 

Barry Bonds
ESPN original programming
2006 American television series debuts
2006 American television series endings
2000s American reality television series
Major League Baseball on television
San Francisco Giants